Parun is a small town in Afghanistan.

Parun or Prasun may also refer to:

Parun District, Afghanistan

 Wasi-wari, a language spoken in Afghanistan